The Isle of Man competed in the 2010 Commonwealth Games held in Delhi, India, from 3 to 14 October 2010.

Medals

Medalist

Archery

Team Isle of Man consists of 3 archers.

Adrian Bruce, Aalin George, Sarah Rigby

Badminton

Team Isle of Man consists of 4 badminton players.

Cristen Callow, Kim Clague, Josh Green, Matt Wilkinson

Boxing

Team Isle of Man consists of 2 boxers.

Krystian Borucki, Dominic Winrow

Cycling

Team Isle of Man consists of 8 cyclists.

Mark Cavendish, Mark Christian, Graeme Hatcher, Peter Kennaugh, Tim Kennaugh, Andrew Roche, Chris Whorrall, Tom Black

Gymnastics

Team Isle of Man consists of 5 gymnasts.

Alex Hedges, Mukunda Measuria, Joe Smith, Adam Hedges, Olivia Curran

Shooting

Team Isle of Man consists of 11 shooters.

Clementine Kermode Clague, Harry Creevy, Jake Keeling, Gemma Kermode, Tim Kneale,
Dave Moore, Neil Parsons, Dan Shacklock, Lara Ward, Steven Watterson, David Walton

See also
 2010 Commonwealth Games

References

External links
  Times of india

Nations at the 2010 Commonwealth Games
Com
Isle of Man at the Commonwealth Games